David Crocker  (1938–1998) was an England international lawn bowler.

Bowls career
He became a national champion after winning the 1971 National pairs title with Denis Cross. During 1971 he also won the Kent singles, pairs and triples.

The following year he won the British Isles pairs and was capped by England for the first time. Also during the indoor season of 1972 he won the EIBA and British Isles pairs.

He represented England in the fours event, at the 1974 British Commonwealth Games in Christchurch, New Zealand.

Personal life
He was the manager of a gas board conversion unit and first played bowls for the Metrogas Bowls Club in 1961.

References

1938 births
1998 deaths
English male bowls players
Bowls players at the 1974 British Commonwealth Games
Commonwealth Games competitors for England